Si Rijigawa (Mongolian:Serjgavaa, ; born 1986-10-08 in Inner Mongolia) is a male Southern Mongol judoka from China  who competed at the 2008 Summer Olympics in the Lightweight (66–73 kg) event.

Major performances
2006 World University Championships - 5th

See also
China at the 2008 Summer Olympics

References
 
http://2008teamchina.olympic.cn/index.php/personview/personsen/5188

1986 births
Living people
Chinese male judoka
Judoka at the 2008 Summer Olympics
Olympic judoka of China
Sportspeople from Inner Mongolia
Judoka at the 2010 Asian Games
Asian Games competitors for China
21st-century Chinese people